Alexandra Recchia (born 25 October 1988) is a French karateka. She is a two-time gold medalist in the women's kumite 50 kg event at the World Karate Championships and a two-time gold medalist in this event at the European Karate Championships.

Career 

She won one of the bronze medals in the women's team kumite event at the 2008 World Karate Championships held in Tokyo, Japan. In 2010, she won the gold medal in this event at the World Karate Championships held in Belgrade, Serbia. In 2012, she won the gold medal in the women's team kumite and the women's kumite 50 kg events at the World Karate Championships held in Paris, France.

At the 2013 World Games held in Cali, Colombia, she won the silver medal in the women's kumite 50 kg event. In the final, she lost against Serap Özçelik of Turkey. In that same year, she also won the bronze medal in the women's kumite 50 kg event at the 2013 World Combat Games held in Saint Petersburg, Russia.

In 2017, she won the gold medal in the women's kumite 50 kg event at the World Games in Wrocław, Poland. In the final, she defeated Miho Miyahara of Japan. In 2018, she won one of the bronze medals in the women's kumite 50 kg event at the European Karate Championships held in Novi Sad, Serbia.

In 2021, she competed at the World Olympic Qualification Tournament held in Paris, France hoping to qualify for the 2020 Summer Olympics in Tokyo, Japan. She won her first three matches and she was then eliminated in the quarterfinals by Jennifer Warling of Luxembourg.

Personal life 

She earned a master's degree in law in 2012. In 2016, she earned her practising certificate.

Achievements

References

External links 

 

Living people
1988 births
Sportspeople from Lyon
French female karateka
Competitors at the 2013 World Games
Competitors at the 2017 World Games
World Games medalists in karate
World Games gold medalists
World Games silver medalists
Karateka at the 2015 European Games
European Games medalists in karate
European Games bronze medalists for France
Competitors at the 2013 Mediterranean Games
Mediterranean Games bronze medalists for France
Mediterranean Games medalists in karate
21st-century French women